The Men event of the 2015 World Allround Speed Skating Championships was held on 7–8 March 2015.

Results

500 m
The race was started at 12:33.

5000 m
The race was started at 14:50.

1500 m
The race was started at 12:01.

10000 m
The race was started at 13:57.

Overall standings
After all events.

References

Men